Fouad Zakariyya (or Fuʼād Zakarīyā; 1927 – 13 March 2010) was an Egyptian philosopher, and critic of Islamist thought who is known as “the father of Arab existentialism.”

Biography
Zakariyya was born in 1927. He studied at Ain Shams University in Cairo, and obtained a doctorate in philosophy in 1956. Zakariyya  was the head of the philosophy department at Kuwait University from 1974 to 1991.

Zakarriya was a recipient of the Sultan Bin Ali Al Owais Cultural Award for Humanities and Future Studies.

Books 
Myth and Reality in the Contemporary Islamist Movement

Articles 
The Incoherence of Islamic Fundamentalism

References

Ain Shams University alumni
Egyptian academics
Egyptian philosophers
Egyptian secularists
Existentialists
Academic staff of Kuwait University
1927 births
2010 deaths